The steamboat Crystal operated in the early 1900s as part of the Puget Sound Mosquito Fleet.

Career
Crystal was a typical small steamer of the type that served small communities along Puget Sound.  Crystal was built at Gig Harbor in 1904 for Miles Coffman.  Crystal was propeller-driven, 45' long, and rated at 25 tons.  Captain Coffman placed Crystal on the run between Tacoma and Wollochet Bay, until she was replaced on this run by  Audrey.  After that,  Crystal was repowered with a  gasoline engine and transferred to Port Angeles.

Notes

References
 Newell, Gordon, Ships of the Inland Sea, Binford and Mort, Portland, OR (2nd Ed. 1960)
 Newell, Gordon, and Williamson, Joe, Pacific Steamboats, Bonanza Books, New York, NY (1963)

1905 ships
Steamboats of Washington (state)
Propeller-driven steamboats of Washington (state)